The Big Match was a British football television programme, screened on ITV between 1968 and 1992.

The Big Match originally launched on London Weekend Television (LWT) – the ITV regional station that served London and the Home Counties at weekends – screening highlights of Football League matches. Other ITV regions had their own shows, but would show The Big Match if they were not covering their own match – particularly often in the case of Southern and HTV. The programme was set up in part as a response to the increased demand for televised football following the 1966 FIFA World Cup and partly as an alternative to the BBC's own football programme, Match of the Day. The Big Match launched the media career of Jimmy Hill, who appeared on the programme as an analyst, and made Brian Moore one of the country's leading football commentators.

The Big Match originally screened match highlights on Sunday afternoons while Match of the Day screened them on Saturday evenings. But in 1978, Michael Grade at London Weekend Television audaciously won exclusive rights to all league football coverage for ITV in a move termed "Snatch of the Day". Although the Office of Fair Trading blocked the move, the BBC was forced to allow ITV to take over the Saturday night slot in alternating seasons. This new arrangement began with the 1980–81 season.

The Big Match theme tunes
The Big Match had no fewer than six theme tunes during its run:

 1968 to 1972: "The Young Scene" by Keith Mansfield
 1972 to 1973: "Cheekybird" by Don Harper
 1973 to 1980: "La Soiree (The Evening)" by David Ordini
 1980 to 1986: "Jubilation" by Jeff Wayne
 1986 to 1988: "Aztec Gold" by Silsoe +
 1988 to 1992: "Goal Crazy" by Rod Argent

+ Aztec Gold was previously used as the theme to ITV's coverage of the 1986 World Cup, and later from 1988 until 1992 as the theme tune to Saint and Greavsie

Live era
ITV's regional-based coverage of football ended in 1983, with The Big Match becoming the sole football highlights programme on ITV. That same year, the first live league match since 1960 was shown, a First Division game on Sunday 2 October between Tottenham Hotspur and Nottingham Forest which Tottenham won 2–1. ITV's football coverage continued and expanded throughout the 1980s, particularly after ITV won exclusive league rights in 1988, after which The Big Match was renamed simply The Match.

The Match
Between 1988 and 1992, the programme's main presenter was Elton Welsby, with Jim Rosenthal sometimes acting as a touchline reporter and interviewer. Former presenter Brian Moore was often the main match commentator, and on other occasions it was Alan Parry. The first live game under that title was on 30 October 1988 when Everton and Manchester United drew 1–1. Much of the coverage focused on the destiny of the First Division title, most memorably on 26 May 1989 when Arsenal's decisive 2–0 win at Liverpool won them the championship by the narrowest of margins at their opponents' expense.

ITV lost rights to the new Premier League to British Sky Broadcasting and the BBC in 1992, and the final top-flight match shown live being Liverpool's 2–0 win over Manchester United on 26 April 1992, a result that sealed the title for Leeds United, who won 3–2 at Sheffield United earlier the same day.

From the start of the 1992/93 season, Welsby left ITV Sport to work for Granada Television full-time and was replaced as presenter by Ian St John. The Match was given another new theme tune, "You Are The Number One" by Union, a theme also used for ITV's coverage of the 1992 European Championship. With the loss of the top flight to Sky Sports and the BBC, The Match focused on the League Cup, the UEFA Cup, the Cup Winners' Cup and international matches, and was shown as and when ITV had the rights to the various matches (the rights to European matches were sold on a club-by-club basis in those days, with the exception of the UEFA Champions League).

ITV retained the rights to what was left of the Football League, but coverage was mainly shown on a regional basis. Many regions showed live matches on Sunday afternoons, and in many cases the programmes carried The Match branding, depending on the region:

The Central Match, 
The Granada Match,
The West Match,
The Meridian Match,
The London Match (which became The Sunday Match from 1993/94),
The Tyne Tees Match (which became The North East Match),
Soccer Sunday (originally a name used by HTV Wales, though some years later it was adopted by many other regions).

The Central Match, The London Match and HTV Wales's Soccer Sunday all used "You Are The Number One" as their theme, and other regions may have done as well.

The Match underwent radical rebranding from the summer of 1993 onward, as Central and Grand Slam Productions took over the production contract from LWT. Matthew Lorenzo became the programme's main presenter, with Jim Rosenthal often hosting highlights programmes. The black and red branding, which had been in place since 1990, was replaced with a blue and silver theme. Many long-serving pundits left the programme, including Ian St John and Jimmy Greaves – though both remained involved with ITV's regional football coverage, and St John returned as a co-commentator for networked coverage from 1996.

Bob Wilson replaced Lorenzo as host from the start of the 1994/95 season, and from the start of the 1995/96 season, the programme got a new instrumental theme. From 1996/97, an instrumental version of the hymn "Jerusalem" was used, having been used during ITV's coverage of Euro '96. The Match reverted to The Big Match name from the start of 1998 and remained in use until 2001 (see below).

Modern era
ITV did gain coverage of the new UEFA Champions League, but all programmes covering that competition went out under the UEFA Champions League title. Through the 1990s ITV covered highlights of the League Cup, and between 1997 and 2001 had the rights to show the FA Cup, both as highlights and live; from the start of FA Cup coverage at the beginning of 1998, ITV revived the name The Big Match for its football coverage. However, when ITV won back English top-flight football highlights in 2001, the new programme was simply called The Premiership.

In 2021, ITV won back the secondary rights to the FA Cup from BT Sport, however The Big Match branding was not used on air.

The Big Match Revisited
On 7 February 2008, ITV4 began showing old editions of The Big Match in its various regional and national forms on a Thursday afternoon, hoping to cash in on the sports TV nostalgia revival headed by the ESPN Classic channel. Each edition was from the same week 25 years earlier. The first series of The Big Match Revisited ran until 15 May 2008, coinciding with the end of the 1982–83 season. The programme mainly featured London Weekend Television's The Big Match but occasionally aired programmes from Granada Television (Match Time) and Television South (The Saturday Match).

The second series began on ITV4 on 1 January 2009 and it covered the second half of the 1978–79 season. The first episode broadcast was Granada's coverage of West Bromwich Albion's 5–3 win at Manchester United on 30 December 1978. The series ran until May, concluding with the 1979 FA Cup Final. A mixture of The Big Match and Kick Off Match episodes were broadcast during the series.

A third series began on BT Sport 2 on 10 July 2017, which covered the 1976–77 season, and was immediately followed by series 4, which covered the 1974–75 season. These two series were not shown on ITV4 until 2020.

Series 5, covering the 1979–80 season made its debut on ITV4 20 February 2021. All episodes were from The Big Match. Season 6, which follows on with the 1980–81 season aired from 14 August 2021.

Following the success of 'The Big Match Revisited', ITV commissioned 'Matchtime Revisted' which followed the same format, but using episodes of the Granada Television regional show 'Match Time', presented by Elton Welsby. The first series began on ITV4 on 26 February 2022, and featured the 1981-82 season.

A seventh season of The Big Match Revisited was commissioned in 2023, and is due to air from April 2023. At 34 episodes it is the longest series to date, and covers the 1977–78 season.

In the 1990s, a similar show called The Big Match Replayed was shown late at night on ITV, repeating various editions of The Big Match from the 1970s.

The Big Match on DVD
In April 2009 a series of Big Match titles were released on DVD for clubs including Manchester United and Tottenham Hotspur. An edition due to be released for Liverpool, entitled Liverpool: Match of the 70's, while containing Big Match content, was unable to be released under the name due to contractual issues.

May 2009 saw the release of further DVDs in the range, including Big Match releases for West Ham United, Newcastle United, Chelsea, and Arsenal (released under the Match of the 70's banner).

Later editions in the series include discs centered on Everton, Manchester City, Leeds United, Aston Villa, Wolves, two volumes of QPR matches and the England national team.

As well as selected match highlights, the bonus content includes much additional footage including the Fun Spot. Viewers' Letters, and the surreal sight of Kevin Keegan, Mick Channon and Elton John presenting the show in December 1976. Other highlights include clips of Peter Taylor talking about his ill-fated book on Brian Clough (which led to their split), a 38-year-old Martin Peters, Brazil 1970 and a clip of a 21-year-old Diego Maradona.

References

1968 British television series debuts
1960s British sports television series
1970s British sports television series
1980s British sports television series
1990s British sports television series
2020s British sports television series
English Football League on television
Football mass media in the United Kingdom
London Weekend Television shows
ITV Sport
English-language television shows
British television series revived after cancellation